Howard James Morgan (21 April 1949 – 22 September 2020) was a British portrait painter who painted three queens. His work is held in the collection of the National Portrait Gallery, London.

Life and work
He was born in Denbigh, North Wales, the son of a lay preacher.

He specialised in portrait painting and was elected a member of the Royal Society of Portrait Painters in 1986. In addition to portraits however, he also executed a variety of landscapes and religious works.

In 2004, he married Sarah Milligan, an abstract painter, with whom he had three children, Velvet, a writer, author and poet, Perseus, a musician and Samuel.He was previously married to Susan Sandilands in 1977, with whom he had three children, Alexander, Romilly and Rupert.

Portrait commissions
HM The Queen
HM Queen Elizabeth, the Queen Mother (Butchers' Hall, London)
HM The Queen of The Netherlands
HRH Prince Michael of Kent
TRH The Prince & Princess of Hanover
Tom Stoppard
Philip Larkin
Francis Crick (National Portrait Gallery, London)
Paul Maurice Dirac (National Portrait Gallery, London)
Dame Antoinette Sibley (National Portrait Gallery, London)
Herbert Norman Howells (National Portrait Gallery, London)

References

1949 births
2020 deaths
People from Denbigh
British portrait painters
20th-century British painters
21st-century British painters